G. Watts Humphrey Jr. (born June 12, 1944, in Cleveland, Ohio) is a Pittsburgh businessman and thoroughbred owner and breeder.

Background 
Humphrey's paternal grandfather was George M. Humphrey, who served as Secretary of the Treasury for President Dwight D. Eisenhower. After graduating from Yale University with a Bachelor of Arts, Humphrey obtained a Master of Business Administration from Harvard Business School.

In business, Humphrey is the president of GWH Holdings, Inc., a private investment company, and the chairman and CEO of International Plastics Equipment Group, Inc. and Centria, an innovator in metal buildings exteriors. Humphrey is also a director of Churchill Downs.  An active owner and breeder, Humphrey is also owner of Shawnee Farms in Harrodsburg, Kentucky and has a long list of stakes winners to his credit.

In 1999 the Keeneland Association honored Humphrey with their Mark of Distinction.

References

External links 
 Biography at Breeders' Cup website

1944 births
Living people
Harvard Business School alumni
20th-century American businesspeople
American racehorse owners and breeders
Yale University alumni